Can Our Love... is the fifth studio album by British band Tindersticks, released in May 2001 on the Beggars Banquet record label.

Reception

Commercial performance
Can Our Love... entered the UK Albums Chart during the week ending 2 June 2001 and peaked at number 47.

Critical response

The album received a generally favourable response from music critics, scoring 81 points out of a possible 100 on the music review aggregator website Metacritic, based on 19 reviews.

Track listing
 "Dying Slowly" – 4:36
 "People Keep Comin' Around" – 7:11
 "Tricklin'" – 2:15
 "Can Our Love..." – 5:57
 "Sweet Release" – 8:55
 "Don't Ever Get Tired" – 3:07
 "No Man in the World" – 6:06
 "Chilitetime" – 7:34

References

2001 albums
Tindersticks albums
Beggars Banquet Records albums